The following is a list of the countries and territories where German is an official language (also known as the Germanosphere). It includes countries that have German as (one of) their nationwide official language(s), as well as dependent territories with German as a co-official language.

German as an official language 
German is the official language of six countries, all of which lie in central and western Europe. These countries (with the addition of South Tyrol of Italy) also form the Council for German Orthography and are referred to as the German Sprachraum (German language area). Since 2004, Meetings of German-speaking countries have been held annually with six participants: Germany, Austria, Belgium, Liechtenstein, Luxembourg, and Switzerland:

Subdivisions of countries 
While not official at the national level, German is a co-official language in subdivisions of the countries listed below. In each of these regions, German is an official language on the administrative level.

Other legal statuses

There are other political entities (countries as well as dependent entities) which acknowledge other legal statuses for the German language or one of its dialects. While these may cover minority rights, support of certain language facilities (schools, media, etc.), and the promotion of cultural protection/heritage, they do not encompass the establishment of German as an "official" language, i.e., being required in public offices or administrative texts.

These countries include:
Brazil (German is a statewide cultural language in Espírito Santo and Rio Grande do Sul; Standard German official in 2 municipalities and non-standard German dialects official in 16 others)
Czech Republic (national minority language)
Denmark (minority language in Syddanmark, established with the Bonn-Copenhagen declarations, 1955)
Hungary (national minority language)
Namibia (national language; co-official language 1884–1990)
Poland (national minority language; also auxiliary language in 31 communes)
Romania (national minority language)
Russia (minority language in the Azovo German National District)
Slovakia (regional minority language)

Although in France, the High German varieties of Alsatian and Moselle Franconian are identified as "regional languages" according to the European Charter for Regional or Minority Languages of 1998, the French government has not yet ratified the treaty, and therefore those varieties have no official legal status.

Due to the German diaspora, other countries with sizable populations of (mostly bilingual) German L1 speakers include Argentina, Australia, Bolivia, Canada, Chile, Paraguay, as well as the United States. However, in none of these countries does German or a German variety have any legal status.

International institutions
German is an official language of the following international institutions:

 International sports associations:
 European Handball Federation (EHF)
 Fédération Internationale de Bobsleigh et de Tobogganing (FIBT)
 Fédération Internationale de Football Association (FIFA)
 Fédération Internationale de Luge de Course (FIL)
 Fédération Internationale de Ski (FIS)
 International Biathlon Union (IBU)
 Union of European Football Associations (UEFA)

Notes

See also
German language in the Basic Law

References 

 
German as an official language
German language

German